Suran (also Romanized as Sūrān and Sooran; also known as Sūrār) is a city in and the capital of Sib and Suran County, Sistan and Baluchestan Province, Iran. At the 2006 census, its population was 9,966, in 1,886 families.

References

Sib and Suran County

Cities in Sistan and Baluchestan Province